Paveh (also Romanized as Pāveh, Pawah, and Pāweh) is a city and capital of Paveh County, Kermanshah Province, Iran. It is located in a region called Hawraman.

The first language spoken by the population in the city is mostly Kurdish, but the language which is used in schools and offices is Persian, the official language of Iran in which almost everyone in the city is fluent.

History
An old myth regarding the name of the city is that the Emperor Yazdgerd III sent his son named Pav to this area to renew his religious Zoroastrian faith. Both Persians and the local Kurds practiced Zoroastrianism during the Sasanian Empire from which this myth is derived.

Geography

Location, topography 
Paveh is located in western Iran and is 112 km far from Kermanshah. It lies in a sub-region along the Iran-Iraq border commonly referred to as Hewraman, which is situated within the larger geographical region of Kurdistan. The city is considered by inhabitants of the region as the capital of Hewraman.

Climate

The town is encircled by fruit gardens. Paveh is situated along a mountainside like most cities and villages in the Hewraman region. Behind the city is the Shaho mountain and ahead of the city is a view of Atashgah, another mountain that was once the site of pilgrimages for ancient religions in the region. Among the most visited places is the Quri Qaleh caveman which is considered as the longest watery cave in the Middle East. The cave is located around 25 kilometers from Paveh's city center.

Demographics
At the 2017 census, its population was 25,771, in 7932 families. The inhabitants of Paveh are Kurds and speak Hawrami (also:Gorani). They follow the Shafi‘i branch of Sunni Islam.

Landmarks

Rivers

Sirwan River is one of the biggest rivers in Paveh. It rises near Sanandaj, in the Zagros Mountains of Iran. It then descends through the mountains, where for some 32 km it forms the border between the two countries. It finally feeds into the Tigris below Baghdad. Navigation of the upper reaches of the Diyala is not possible because of its narrow defiles, but the river's valley provides an important trade route between Iran and Iraq.

Mountains 

Paveh is established among mountains on Zagros Mountains. The mountain chain of Shaho is located in the west of Paveh. Shaho is the highest mountain in Kermanshah with an elevation of 3390.

Notable people 
 Mirza Ebdilqadire Paweyi

See also

Rawansar
Javanrud

References

External links 

Omid Sālehi, Customs of the Land of Stone and Wind (Ā'in-e Sar'zamin-e Sang va Bād), in Persian, Jadid Online, 5 May 2009
Audio slideshow (5 min 39 sec).

Populated places in Paveh County
Cities in Kermanshah Province
Kurdish settlements in Kermanshah Province